Fernando Rufino de Paulo (born 22 May 1985) is a Brazilian paracanoeist. He represented Brazil at the 2020 Summer Paralympics.

Career
Rufino represented Brazil at the 2020 Summer Paralympics in the men's VL2 event and won a gold medal.

References

1985 births
Living people
Sportspeople from São Paulo
Brazilian male canoeists
Paracanoeists at the 2020 Summer Paralympics
Medalists at the 2020 Summer Paralympics
Paralympic medalists in paracanoe
Paralympic gold medalists for Brazil
21st-century Brazilian people